James Aickin (died 1803), was an Irish stage actor who worked at the Edinburgh Theatre in Scotland and in theatres in the West End of London.

He was the younger brother of the actor Francis Aickin (died 1803) with whom he shared the stage at the Edinburgh Theatre before he gave offence to his public by his protest against the discharge of a fellow-actor.  He therefore went to London, and from 1767 to 1800 was a member of the Drury Lane Company and for some years a deputy manager.  He quarrelled with John Philip Kemble, with whom, in 1792, he fought a bloodless duel.

Biography
James Aickin was the younger brother of actor Francis Aickin, and like him brought up to be a weaver.  After joining a company strolling through Ireland, and gaining some experience of the stage, he embarked for Scotland, and presently accepted an engagement to appear at the Edinburgh Theatre.  He was very favourably received, and gradually, from his merit as an actor and his sensible deportment in private life, became the head of the Canongate Company, playing most of the leading parts in tragedy and comedy.

In January 1767 a riot took place in the Edinburgh Theatre because of the discharge by the management of one Stanley, an actor of small merit, in whom, however, a section of the public took extraordinary interest.  The inside of the building was demolished, the furniture ransacked, and the fixtures destroyed.  It was not until troops from Edinburgh Castle had come to the relief of the city guard that the rioters were dispersed, and the theatre saved from further injury.

James Aickin, who had particularly offended the rioters, left Edinburgh, and, accepting an engagement at Drury Lane, made his first appearance there in December 1767 as Colonel Camply in Kenrick's comedy The Widowed Wife.  He continued a member of the 'Drury Lane company, with occasional appearances at the Haymarket Theatre during the summer months, until his retirement in 1800.  He was for some years one of the deputy managers of Drury Lane, and was reputed to be a useful and pleasing actor, easy, graceful, and natural of manner.  "His forte lay in the representation of an honest steward or an affectionate parent".  Boaden states that while the tones of his voice were among "the sweetest that ever met the ear", he was not happy in his temper.

In 1792 he took offence at some of John Kemble's managerial arrangements, was personally rude to him, and challenged him to a duel.  The actors met in "some field in Marylebone", a third actor, Charles Bannister, undertaking the duties of second to both combatants. Aickin discharged his pistol, but fortunately missed his manager, who declined to fire in return; a reconciliation was then accomplished.  Kemble afterwards explained that "he saw from his adversary's levelling at him that he was in no danger".

Notes

References

 Endnotes:
Jackson's History of the Scottish Stage, 1793 
Secret History of the Green Rooms, 1790 
Genest's History of the Stage, 1832
Boaden's Life of John Philip Kemble, 1825

Irish male stage actors
1803 deaths
18th-century Irish male actors
Year of birth unknown
Irish emigrants to Great Britain